Sachseln is a village and municipality in the canton of Obwalden in Switzerland. Besides the village of Sachseln, the municipality includes the hamlets of Edisried, Ewil and Flüeli-Ranft.

History
Sachseln is first mentioned in 1173 as Saxhslen.

Geography

Of this area, 45.4% is used for agricultural purposes, while 39.4% is forested. Of the rest of the land, 3.1% is settled (buildings or roads) and the remainder (12.1%) is non-productive (rivers, glaciers or mountains).

The municipality is located on Lake Sarnen (Sarnersee).  It consists of the village of Sachseln and the hamlets of Edisried, Ewil and Flüeli-Ranft.

The geographic center of Switzerland is in Sachseln.

Demographics

, 13.4% of the population was made up of foreign nationals. Over the last 10 years the population has grown at a rate of 8.7%. Most of the population speaks German  (92.8%), with Serbo-Croatian being second most common ( 1.5%) and Portuguese being third ( 1.1%).   the gender distribution of the population was 49.6% male and 50.4% female.   there are 1,417 households, while in  the total was 2,104 with 1,867 households in Sachseln and 237 in  
Flüeli-Ranft.

In the 2007 federal election the most popular party was the CVP which received 36.2% of the vote.  The next three most popular parties were the SVP (30.9%), the Other (19.9%) and the SPS (13%).

In Sachseln about 71% of the population (between age 25-64) have completed either non-mandatory upper secondary education or additional higher education (either university or a Fachhochschule).

 the religious population distribution was; 3,641 or 78.8% are Roman Catholic, while 315 or 6.8% belonged to the  Swiss Reformed Church.  There are 664 individuals (or about 14.37% of the population) who belong to another church (not listed on the census) or no church.

The historical population is given in the following table:

Economy
Sachseln has an unemployment rate of 0.76%.  , there were 251 people employed in the primary economic sector and about 100 businesses involved in this sector.  1,452 people are employed in the secondary sector and there are 46 businesses in this sector.  709 people are employed in the tertiary sector, with 105 businesses in this sector.

A major employer within the municipality is Maxon Motor, a manufacturer of precision electric motors, who have their corporate headquarters and a production plant at Ewil. A total of 1,150 employees are employed at Maxon Motor's Sachseln site.

Transport
Sachseln is served by the railway stations of Sachseln and Ewil Maxon, situated respectively in the village centre and in the hamlet of Ewil. Both stations are on the Brünig line, and the half-hourly Lucerne S-Bahn S5 service stops at both stations.

Notable people
 Dorothea Wyss (* around 1430/32, † after 1487), wife of Niklaus von Flüe, the patron saint of Switzerland.

Sights

The main sights of Sacheln are: the local saint Bruder Klaus (place of birth, place of residence, museum, crust Flüeli-Ranft), a church of pilgrimage, the school building Mattli, and the geographical centre of Switzerland Aelggi.

References

External links

 
Municipalities of Obwalden